Manacorda is an Italian surname. Notable people with the surname include: 

Antonello Manacorda (born 1970), Italian violinist and conductor
Bianca Manacorda (born 1997), Italian pair skater

Italian-language surnames